Carolei is a town and comune in the province of Cosenza in the Calabria region of southern Italy.

People from Carolei 

 Orfeo Reda, (1932) painter

References

Cities and towns in Calabria